Martik Qarah Khanian (born 17 July 1949), known mononymously as Martik (Armenian: Մարտիկ), is an Iranian Armenian singer and songwriter.

Discography

Studio albums
 Martik 1 1977 Avang
 Toro Yadam Nemireh, 1983 OF-OZ Records
 ABGD…(Sirelis), 1984 (Armenian Album)
 Refaghat, 1986 Taraneh Enterprises Inc
 Parandeh, 1987 Taraneh Enterprises Inc
 Niloofar(Setareh), 1989 Taraneh Enterprises Inc
 Khab, 1990 Taraneh Enterprises Inc
 Harir, 1991 Taraneh Enterprises Inc
 Bahaar, 1992 Caltex Records
 Mehmoon (with Shohreh), 1993 Caltex Records
 Sadaf Va Sang, 1993 Taraneh Enterprises Inc
 Hoosa, 1995 Taraneh Enterprises Inc (Armenian Album)
 Navaye Eshgh, 1996 Nava Entertainment
 Atreh Lahzeha, 1997 Taraneh Enterprises Inc
 Ba Shoma, 2002 Caltex Records
 Sayehneshin, 2015 Sole Records

Single

 Pastime Paradise 1976
 Sha'er 1976 (Ft. Googoosh)
 Adam O Havva 1978 (Ft. Googoosh)
 Sirelis 1984 (on Album Sirelis)
 Karotic 1984 (on Album Sirelis)
 Dou Es Im Sere 1984 (on Album Sirelis)
 Cheshme To 1987 (on Album Tanine Solh)
 Faghat Tou 1994 (on Album Khaneh Ashegh Koojast)
 Negahe To 2003 (Ft. Helen Matevosian)
 Windmills Of Your Mind 2017
 Refaghat 2018 (Ft. Googoosh)
 Asheghet Hastam 2019 (Ft. Googoosh)
 Eshghe Kamyab 2019 (Ft. Googoosh)
 Donya Khanoom 2022

See also
 List of Iranian musicians
 Music of Iran
 Persian pop music
 Rock and alternative music in Iran

References

External links 
 

1949 births
Living people
Iranian exiles
Iranian musicians
Iranian composers
Iranian guitarists
Iranian pop singers
Iranian songwriters
20th-century singers
Iranian male singers
Iranian music arrangers
Persian-language singers
People from Abadan, Iran
20th-century male singers
Iranian singer-songwriters
Ethnic Armenian male singers
20th-century Iranian male singers
Iranian people of Armenian descent
Iranian emigrants to the United States